Perur taluk is a taluk in Coimbatore district, Tamil Nadu, India associated with the neighbourhood of Perur in the city of Coimbatore. It was created by Government of Tamil Nadu in 2013. The taluk had a population of 393,350 according to the 2011 Census.

References

Taluks of Coimbatore district